Nuclear receptor TLX (homologue of the Drosophila tailless gene) also known as NR2E1 (Nuclear receptor subfamily 2 group E member 1) is a protein that in humans is encoded by the NR2E1 gene. TLX is a member of the nuclear receptor family of intracellular transcription factors.

Function 

TLX regulates the expression of another nuclear receptor, RAR.

TLX also is essential for normal brain-eye coordination and appears to play a role in control of aggressive behavior.

Adult neural stem cells are nuclear receptor TLX-positive and TLX expression in these cells is crucial in maintaining their undifferentiated state. Furthermore, TLX regulates adult neural stem cell proliferation. Removal of TLX from the adult mouse brain resulted in a reduction of stem cell proliferation and spatial learning.

Tlx-positive cells of the subventricular zone of adult mouse brain are self-renewing stem cells. Mutation of the Tlx gene in adult mouse brain leads to complete loss of neurogenesis in the subventricular zone. Tlx is also required for transition from radial glial cells to astrocyte-like neural stem cells.

Ligands 
TLX belongs to a small family of NRs that lack two helices in the ligand-binding domain, forming an enlarged binding pocket. Three compounds, termed ccrp1–3 (famprofazone, 1-(1,5-dimethylpyrazole-3-carbonyl)-4-(diphenylmethyl)piperazine, dydrogesterone), have been discovered in high-throughput screening that enhance TLX's ability of transcription repression with high potency.

References

Further reading

External links 
 

Intracellular receptors